Lieutenant-General George Ehelbert Cornell Macdonald CMM, CD (born c. 1950) was Vice Chief of the Defence Staff of the Canadian Forces.

Military career
Educated at the University of Calgary, Macdonald joined the Canadian Forces in 1966 and served as an operational fighter pilot. He held posts in Germany and Norway. He became Deputy Commander-in-Chief of the North American Aerospace Defense Command in 1997 and Vice Chief of the Defence Staff in 2001 before retiring in 2004.

Macdonald was appointed a Member of the Royal Victorian Order in 1978.

References

|-

|-

Canadian Forces Air Command generals
Living people
Commanders of the Order of Military Merit (Canada)
Vice Chiefs of the Defence Staff (Canada)
Year of birth missing (living people)